The Southwestern Showdown is an annual rivalry series first held in 2014 between FC Tucson and Albuquerque Sol FC, soccer clubs in USL League Two. The club to gain the most league standings points over the course of all regular-season meetings is given the Golden Rattler, a trophy depicting a rattlesnake ready to strike, to hold for the following year.

Inaugural series
The first ever match between the two clubs was held on June 6, 2014 at Ben Rios Field in Albuquerque, a 1–1 draw.  A day later on the same field Tucson won 3–0.  Tucson secured both the 2014 series (7–1) and the Mountain Division title with a 1–0 victory in the final match, held in Tucson on July 4 at the Kino Sports Complex North Stadium.

Results
Three league standings points are awarded for a victory and one for a draw.  In the event that the two clubs earn an equal number of league points in their regular-season head-to-head matches, the series tie is broken first by total goals scored within the matches (aggregate score) and then by Mountain Division standings at the end of the regular season.

 Series tie broken by aggregate score.

References 

Soccer rivalries in the United States
FC Tucson
Albuquerque Sol FC
2014 establishments in Arizona
2014 establishments in New Mexico